Charles Louis Auguste Jacques Seydoux (1870–1929) was a French diplomat, economist and Director of Commercial Relations at the French Foreign Ministry.

Seydoux was the son of Anne Elisabeth (Sers) and Louis Auguste Seydoux. He was the organiser of the Blockade Department during the First World War and was Assistant Director for Commercial Affairs from May 1919 to October 1924. He was then Deputy Director of Political and Commercial Affairs from until December 1926. He was estimated by his colleagues as the most creative thinker on political matters and he wrote every major paper on economics at the Foreign Ministry for eight years. During the 1920s he was the chief reparations expert on the French side and was firmly in favour of Franco-German economic rapprochement.

The historian Stephen Schuker called Seydoux "by far the most lucid mind among senior French bureaucrats in the 1920s...self-effacing, nonpolitical, but independent-minded who put his expertise at the service of the most diverse political superiors and managed to win the admiration of them all".

Works
De Versailles au Plan Young (Paris: Plon, 1932).

Notes

Further reading
Stanislas Jennesson, ‘L’Europe de Jacques Seydoux’, Revue Historique 299, 20. 1 (1998), pp. 123–143.
Stanislas Jeannesson, ‘Jacques Seydoux et la diplomatie économique dans la France de l’apres-guerre’, RI, 121 (2005), pp. 15–17.
N. Jordan, ‘The reorientation of French diplomacy in the 1920s: the role of Jacques Seydoux’, English Historical Review, 117, 473 (2002), pp. 870–873.
Georges-Henri Souto, ‘Die deutschen Reparationen und das Seydoux-Projekt, 1920-1921’, Vierteljahrschaft fur Zeitgeschichte 23 (1975), pp. 237–270.

External links
 

1870 births
1929 deaths
French diplomats
French economists